Roberto Gómez Fernández (born March 14, 1964, in México City, D.F., México) is a Mexican producer, artist, actor and comedian.

Early life 
Gómez Fernández was born in México City, the son of comedian and actor Roberto Gómez Bolaños and his wife, Graciela Fernández.

Personal life 
In 2001, Gómez Fernández married actress Chantal Andere; they divorced in 2006. A few years later, in 2010, he married actress Jessica Coch; their marriage ended in divorce a year later in 2011.

Gómez Fernández has two children, Roberto Gómez Bolívar and Tamara Gómez Bolívar.

Married Krystell Padilla Martin

Filmography

Awards and nominations

Premios TVyNovelas

Premios People en Español

Premios ACE

Premios Bravo

Premios Mundo Latino

References

External links

1964 births
Living people
Mexican male television actors
Mexican male comedians
Mexican telenovela producers
Male actors from Mexico City
Comedians from Mexico City
Mexican people of Spanish descent